Rosedale is a village in Iberville Parish, Louisiana, United States. The population was 664 in 2020. It is part of the Baton Rouge metropolitan statistical area.

Geography
Rosedale is located in northern Iberville Parish at  (30.439929, -91.461588). It is bordered to the south by the village of Grosse Tete, and Bayou Grosse Tete flows through the center of Rosedale.

Louisiana Highways 76 and 77 intersect at the center of Rosedale. LA 76 leads east  to Port Allen across the Mississippi River from Baton Rouge, and west  to a point near Ramah and Interstate 10. LA 77, following Bayou Grosse Tete, leads northwest  to Maringouin and southeast  to Interstate 10 at Grosse Tête.

Demographics

As of the 2020 United States census, there were 664 people, 338 households, and 221 families residing in the village.

Education
Residents are served by the Iberville Parish School Board. Residents are zoned to North Iberville Elementary School and Plaquemine High School. North Iberville Elementary and High School previously served the community, but North Iberville High School closed in 2009 despite a parental movement to keep the school open. Parents criticized the rezoning to Plaquemine High because of the long distances involved.

In 2022, the Iberville Parish School board voted to reopen North Iberville High School. The high school will be integrated with the Iberville STEM Academy. Students returned to North Iberville High School in the fall of 2022.

References

External links
 North Iberville Elementary School

Villages in Louisiana
Villages in Iberville Parish, Louisiana
Baton Rouge metropolitan area